Charles Brandon, 1st Duke of Suffolk, 1st Viscount Lisle,  (22 August 1545) was an English military leader and courtier. Through his third wife, Mary Tudor, he was brother-in-law to King Henry VIII.

Biography
Charles Brandon was the second but only surviving son of Sir William Brandon, Henry Tudor's standard-bearer at the Battle of Bosworth Field, where Richard III was slain. His mother, Elizabeth Bruyn (d. March 1494), was daughter and co-heiress of Sir Henry Bruyn (died 1461).

Charles Brandon was brought up at the court of Henry VII, and became Henry VIII's closest friend. He is described by Dugdale as "a person comely of stature, high of courage and conformity of disposition to King Henry VIII, with whom he became a great favourite." Brandon held a succession of offices in the royal household, becoming Master of the Horse in 1513, and received many valuable grants of land. On 15 May 1513, he was created Viscount Lisle, having entered into a marriage contract with his ward, Elizabeth Grey, suo jure Viscountess Lisle. The contract was ended and the title was forfeited as a result of Brandon's marriage to Mary Tudor in 1515.

He distinguished himself at the sieges of Thérouanne and Tournai in the French campaign of 1513. One of the agents of Margaret of Savoy, governor of the Netherlands, writing from before Thérouanne, reminded her that Lord Lisle was a "second king" and advised her to write him a kind letter.
At this time, Henry VIII was secretly urging Margaret to marry Lisle, whom he created Duke of Suffolk on 4 March 1514, although he was careful to disclaim any complicity in the project to her father, Maximilian I, Holy Roman Emperor. When Brandon was made Duke of Suffolk, he became only the third duke in the kingdom.

After his marriage to Mary, Suffolk lived for some years in retirement, but he was present at the Field of the Cloth of Gold in 1520. 
In 1523 he was sent to Calais to command the English troops there. 
He invaded France in company with Floris d'Egmont, Count of Buren, who was at the head of the Flemish troops, and laid waste the north of France, but disbanded his troops at the approach of winter.

Brandon was appointed Earl Marshal of England in 1524, a position previously held by Thomas Howard, 2nd Duke of Norfolk. However, in 1533 he relinquished the office to Thomas Howard, 3rd Duke of Norfolk, "whose auncesto[ur]s of longe tyme hadde the same until nowe of late."

After Wolsey's disgrace, Suffolk's influence increased. He was sent with Thomas Howard, 3rd Duke of Norfolk, to demand the Great Seal from Wolsey; and Suffolk acted as High Steward at the new queen's coronation. He was one of the commissioners appointed by Henry to dismiss Catherine's household, a task he found distasteful.

His family had a residence on the west side of Borough High Street, London, for at least half a century prior to his building of Suffolk Place at the site.

Charles supported Henry's ecclesiastical policy, receiving a large share of the lands after the dissolution of the monasteries. In 1544, he was for the second time in command of an English army for the invasion of France. He died at Guildford, Surrey, on 24 August in the following year. At Henry VIII's expense he was buried at Windsor in St George's Chapel. Brandon was perhaps the only person in England who successfully retained Henry VIII's affection for most of a period of forty years.

Marriage to Mary Tudor
Charles Brandon took part in the jousts which celebrated the marriage of Mary Tudor, King Henry VIII's sister, with King Louis XII of France. Later, on King Louis XII's death in 1515, he was accredited to negotiate various matters with the King; and was sent to congratulate the new King, Francis I of France, as well as to negotiate Princess Mary's return to England.
Love between Charles and the young Dowager Queen Mary had existed before her marriage, and King Francis I roundly charged him with an intention to marry her. King Francis, perhaps in the hope of his wife Queen Claude's death, had himself been one of Mary's suitors in the first week of her widowhood, in which Mary had asserted that she had given him her confidence in order to avoid his overtures.

King Francis I and King Henry VIII both professed a friendly attitude towards the marriage of the lovers, but Charles had many political enemies, and Mary feared that she might again be sacrificed for political considerations. The King's Council, not wishing to see Charles Brandon gain further power at court, were opposed to the match. The truth was that King Henry was anxious to obtain from King Francis the gold plate and jewels which had been given or promised to his sister Mary by King Louis XII as well as the reimbursement of the expenses of her marriage with King Louis; and he practically made his acceptance in Charles's suit dependent on Charles obtaining them. However, when Charles was sent to bring Mary back to England, King Henry VIII made him promise that he would not propose to her. Once in France though, Charles was persuaded by Mary to abandon this pledge. The couple wed in secret at the Hotel de Clugny on 3 March 1515 in the presence of just 10 people, among whom was King Francis I. Charles announced their marriage to Thomas Wolsey who had been their fast friend.

Technically, this was treason as Charles Brandon had married a royal princess without King Henry's consent. Thus, King Henry VIII was outraged, and the privy council urged that Charles should be imprisoned or executed. He was only saved from King Henry's anger by Wolsey and from the affection that the King had for both his sister and for him. Hence, the couple got off easily and were charged only with a heavy fine of £24,000 to be paid to the King in yearly instalments of £1000, as well as the whole of Mary's dowry from King Louis XII of £200,000, together with her plate and jewels. Nonetheless, the fine was later reduced by the King. They were then openly married at Greenwich Hall on 13 May 1515 in the presence of King Henry VIII and his courtiers. The Duke of Suffolk had been already twice married, to Margaret Neville (the widow of John Mortimer) and to Anne Browne, to whom he had been betrothed before his marriage with Margaret Neville. Anne Browne died in 1511, but Margaret Neville, from whom he had obtained a declaration of nullity on the ground of consanguinity, was still living. He secured in 1528 a bull from Pope Clement VII that assured the legitimacy of his marriage with Mary Tudor.

Mary died on 25 June 1533, and in September of the same year, Charles married his ward, the 14-year-old Katherine Willoughby (1519–1580), suo jure Baroness Willoughby de Eresby. Katherine had been betrothed to his eldest surviving son, Henry, Earl of Lincoln, but the boy was too young to marry. Not desiring to risk losing Katherine's lands, Charles married her himself in the end.
 

By Katherine Willoughby, he had his two youngest sons who showed great promise, Henry (1535–1551) and Charles (c. 1537–1551), who later became Dukes of Suffolk. However, they eventually died of the sweating sickness within an hour of each other.

Between 1536–1543, Charles gave his London residence Suffolk Place, rebuilt by him in fine Renaissance style in 1522, to King Henry VIII in exchange for Norwich Place on the Strand, London. He also leased Hoxne manor at this time.

Marriages and children
Before 7 February 1507, Charles Brandon firstly married Margaret Neville (born 1466), widow of Sir John Mortimer (d. before 12 November 1504), and daughter of John Neville, 1st Marquess of Montagu (slain at the Battle of Barnet) by Isabel Ingaldesthorpe (or Ingoldesthorpe), daughter and heiress of Sir Edmund Ingaldesthorpe (or Ingoldesthorpe) and his wife, Joanna Tiptoft. Charles and Margaret had no children. The marriage was declared void about 1507 by the Archdeaconry Court of London, and later by papal bull dated 12 May 1528. Margaret subsequently married Robert Downes, gentleman.

In early 1508, in a secret ceremony at Stepney, and later publicly at St Michael's, Cornhill, Charles secondly married Anne Browne (the step-daughter of Margaret Neville's sister, Lucy Neville), daughter of Sir Anthony Browne (Standard Bearer of England in 1485), by his first wife, Eleanor Ughtred, the daughter of Sir Robert Ughtred (c. 1428c. 1487) of Kexby, North Yorkshire and Katherine Eure, daughter of Sir William Eure of Stokesley, Yorkshire. By Anne Browne, he had two daughters:

Lady Anne Brandon (1507–1557), who married firstly Edward Grey, 3rd Baron Grey of Powis, and after the dissolution of this union, Randal Harworth.
Lady Mary Brandon (1510c. 1542), who married Thomas Stanley, 2nd Baron Monteagle.

Charles was then contracted to marry Elizabeth Grey, 5th Baroness Lisle (1505–1519), and was thus created 1st Viscount Lisle of the third creation in 1513, but the contract was annulled, and he surrendered the title either before 1519 or in 1523.

In May 1515, Charles thirdly married Mary Tudor, Queen Dowager of France (18 March 149625 June 1533). After their marriage, Charles and Mary resided at Westhorpe Hall where they raised all their children. They had two sons who died young, and two daughters:
Lord Henry Brandon (11 March 15161522)
Lady Frances Brandon (16 July 151720 November 1559), who married Henry Grey, 1st Duke of Suffolk, 3rd Marquess of Dorset, by whom she was the mother of Lady Jane Grey.
Lady Eleanor Brandon (151927 September 1547), who married Henry Clifford, 2nd Earl of Cumberland.
Henry Brandon, 1st Earl of Lincoln (c. 15231 March 1534)

On 7 September 1533, Charles fourthly married Katherine Willoughby, 12th Baroness Willoughby de Eresby (22 March 151919 September 1580), the daughter and heiress of William Willoughby, 11th Baron Willoughby de Eresby, by his second wife, María de Salinas. He had two sons by her, both of whom died young of the sweating sickness:

Henry Brandon, 2nd Duke of Suffolk (18 September 153514 July 1551)
Charles Brandon, 3rd Duke of Suffolk (153714 July 1551)

After Charles Brandon's death in 1545, his widow, Katherine married Richard Bertie.

Charles also had a number of illegitimate children:
Sir Charles Brandon, who married Elizabeth Pigot, widow of Sir James Strangways.
Frances Brandon, who married firstly William Sandon, and secondly Andrew Bilsby.
Mary Brandon, who married Robert Ball of Scottow, Norfolk, the uncle of Temperance Flowerdew and John Pory.

Fictional portrayals
 The romance between Mary Tudor and Charles Brandon is fictionalized in When Knighthood Was in Flower, by American author Charles Major writing under the pseudonym Edwin Caskoden. It was first published by The Bobbs-Merrill Company in 1898 and proved an enormous success. At least three films have been based on this novel.
 A 1908 motion picture of the same name or under the title When Knights Were Bold  was directed by Wallace McCutcheon. This is considered a lost film.
 He is portrayed by Forrest Stanley in the 1922 film adaptation When Knighthood Was in Flower, directed by Robert G. Vignola.
 Richard Todd portrays Brandon in The Sword and the Rose, an account of his romance with Mary Tudor in 1515.
The Reluctant Queen by Molly Costain Haycraft presents another fictionalised version of the relationship between Brandon and Mary Tudor.
 Brandon was portrayed by actor Henry Cavill in the Showtime series The Tudors. In this series he is incorrectly portrayed as being married to Margaret Tudor, when in fact he was married to Mary Tudor. He served as a confidant to his best friend Henry VIII, and therefore a number of Brandon's storylines are fictionalized for dramatic purposes. For example, he is married twice and is estranged from second wife Catherine Willoughby Brandon, Duchess of Suffolk (Rebekah Wainwright). He takes on an official mistress, a French expatriate (played by Selma Brook), who cares for him up until his death. Also, he only has one son here, Edward (Michael Winder), presumably a representation of Henry Brandon, 2nd Duke of Suffolk.
 He is a character in the novels Mary, Queen of France, The Lady in the Tower and The Shadow of the Pomegranate by Jean Plaidy.
 He appears as a character in the Man Booker Prize winning novel Wolf Hall by Hilary Mantel, and in its sequels, Bring Up the Bodies and The Mirror and the Light.
 He is portrayed by actor Richard Dillane in the BBC drama Wolf Hall, based on Mantel's book.
 In the novel The Serpent Garden by Judith Merkle Riley, Brandon is portrayed as an immensely strong but rather dimwitted noble with a poor sense of spelling.
 Brian Blessed portrayed Suffolk in the film Henry VIII and His Six Wives (1972).
Brandon is portrayed by actor Jordan Renzo in the 2019 Starz series The Spanish Princess based on the novels The Constant Princess and The King's Curse by Philippa Gregory.

Notes

References

Further reading

 (primarily on his wife, Mary Tudor)
 (primarily on his wife, Catherine)

1480s births
1545 deaths
201
Ambassadors of England to France
Knights of the Garter
Lord-Lieutenants of Buckinghamshire
Charles
Lord-Lieutenants of Oxfordshire
Lord Presidents of the Council
Military leaders of the Italian Wars
Burials at St George's Chapel, Windsor Castle
16th-century English diplomats
16th-century English nobility
1
Peers of England created by Henry VIII